Pleasant Street Historic District may refer to:

in the United States
(by state then city)
 Pleasant Street Historic District (Hot Springs, Arkansas), listed on the NRHP in Arkansas
Pleasant Street Historic District (Gainesville, Florida), listed on the NRHP in Florida
 West Pleasant Street Historic District, Maquoketa, IA, listed on the NRHP in Iowa
 Pleasant Street Historic District (Belmont, Massachusetts), listed on the NRHP in Massachusetts
 Pleasant Street Historic District (Marlborough, Massachusetts), listed on the NRHP in Massachusetts
 Crystal Lake and Pleasant Street Historic District, Newton, MA, listed on the NRHP in Massachusetts
 Lower Pleasant Street District, Worcester, MA, listed on the NRHP in Massachusetts

See also
Pleasant Street School (disambiguation)
 Pleasant-School Street Historic District